Blake Charles Goldring , (born September 13, 1958) is a Canadian business leader, philanthropist, and entrepreneur. He is the Executive Chairman of AGF Management Limited, an independent Canadian-based investment management firm serving retail and institutional investors since 1957. Under Goldring's leadership, AGF has grown its assets to approximately $36 billion in 2018.

Goldring is also a chairman of Canada Company: Many Ways to Serve, a non-partisan organization he founded in 2006 to bring together community leaders across Canada to support the Canadian military and their families.

Early life and education 

Goldring was born on September 13, 1958 in Toronto, the second eldest of five children born to C. Warren Goldring and Barbara (Dowd) Goldring. Goldring attended St. Andrew's Junior High and York Mills Collegiate Institute in Toronto.

Goldring attended Victoria College at the University of Toronto, graduating from the school with an honours degree in Economics.  In his fourth year, he became the National Vice President of AIESEC, a student-led commerce and economics organization, based at the time in Montreal. Following this appointment, he transferred to McGill University to fulfill his duties as National Vice President and complete his undergraduate degree.  He went on to pursue graduate studies at INSEAD in France, where he earned a Master of Business Administration [MBA] in 1982.

In 1984, he became a Fellow of the Institute of Canadian Bankers (FICB).

In 1996, Goldring earned the Chartered Financial Analyst (CFA) designation.

In 2008, Goldring received an honorary Doctor of Laws degree from the Royal Military College.

In 2021, Goldring received an Honorary Doctorate of Humane Letters, Honoris Causa, from Victoria University, Toronto at the University of Toronto.

Career

Early career  

Following his graduation from INSEAD, Goldring joined the Bank of Montreal (BMO).  At BMO, Goldring worked in international banking, and later, corporate banking, and was based in Toronto for five years.

Career at AGF  

In late 1987, Goldring left BMO to work at AGF, his father's company. He started as an analyst working on the firm's Japanese investment portfolios, and in 1989 he assumed responsibilities for the Quebec and Eastern sales regions. In 1991, his responsibilities expanded to developing AGF International Advisors Company Limited in Ireland, and in 1994, he was named Head of Sales and Marketing for AGF.

In 1997, Goldring was named President and Chief Operating Officer of AGF and three years later, in 2000, he was named Chief Executive Officer. In 2006, Goldring was appointed Chairman and Chief Executive Officer of AGF.

In 2018, he made the decision to transition into a new role as Executive Chairman  for the firm, effective December 1, 2018.

Under Goldring, the firm acquired wealth management firms, including Global Strategy Holdings [2000], Cypress Capital Management [2004], Doherty & Associates Investment Counsel [2004], Highstreet Asset Management [2006], Acuity [2011], and FFCM [2015].  During the same period, the company built a Trust Company, AGF Trust, later [2012] sold to Laurentian Bank for $420 million, and Unisen, a third-party administration firm, sold in 2005 for $114 million to Citibank.

Goldring also oversaw the 2002 merger of NCL Investments into Smith & Williamson, a London, UK-based wealth management firm.

As Chairman and Chief Executive Officer, Goldring led the development of four strategic investment platforms at AGF to expand the firm's client base to include more institutional and high net-worth investors and diversify from its mutual fund origins.  The four platforms focus on institutional, private client, retail and alternative investment management.

Community involvement

Honorary Colonel appointments 

A lifelong history buff, Goldring became associated with The Royal Regiment of Canada in 1996. In 2005, he succeeded Major General (retired) Reginald W. Lewis, then Honorary Colonel of The Royal Regiment of Canada. Goldring accepted the post and held the role of Honorary Colonel of The Royal Regiment of Canada from 2006 to 2011. During his tenure, His Royal Highness Prince Charles presented the regiment with its new colours in 2009, hosted the Toronto Garrison Officers' Ball in 2007 which raised $250,000 for hospitals in Afghanistan and re-badged the Arctic Bay Cadet Corp with the Royal Regiment of Canada.

In 2011, Goldring was recognized for his support of the Canadian Army and was appointed as Canada's first-ever Honorary Colonel of the Canadian Army.  In 2016, the appointment was subsequently extended to November 2017. He retired in 2017 having served a total of 12 years with the Canadian Armed Forces.

Canada Company: Many Ways to Serve

Goldring is the founder of Canada Company: Many Ways to Serve, a charitable, non-partisan organization created in 2006 to connect business and community leaders with Canada's military. Among its many initiatives, Canada Company awards scholarships to the children of fallen soldiers to assist with their post-secondary education. In addition, Canada Company created and administered the Military Employment Transition (MET) Program from 2012 to 2018. This program helped 3,600 Veterans find meaningful employment in the civilian workforce.

Other community involvement

As a long-standing participant and advocate for the Canadian financial industry and broader community, Goldring has been increasingly balancing his time across a number of organizations, including his involvement on the Board of C.D. Howe Institute and other industry organizations. He is also a Member of the Business Council of Canada  (formerly the Canadian Council of Chief Executives).

In addition, Goldring is the immediate-past board chair at Sunnybrook Health Sciences Centre in Toronto, and serves as a director with the Jeanne Sauvé Foundation  and the Canadian Film Centre. In 2011, he served as co-chair for the Toronto Prosperity Initiative report with City Councillor Michael Thompson. Goldring is active in The University of Toronto's alumni community. He has made large donations towards athletics, student life, programs and Soldiers' Tower. In particular, he funded the Norman Jewison Stream in the Vic One program and enabled, along with his sister Judy Goldring and father Warren Goldring, the creation of the Goldring Student Centre at Victoria College.

Goldring also sits on the advisory boards for the Lawrence National Centre of Policy and Management at Western University, the Global Water Institute at Carleton University and the Mosaic Institute.  Additionally, he is on the National Advisory Council for The Walrus, a Canadian general interest magazine on Canadian and international affairs.

Other causes and groups receiving support and funding include TAVI, establishing the Sherif & Mary-Lou Hanna Chair in Surgical Oncology Research at the Sunnybrook Health Sciences Centre, The United Way, the Toronto Symphony Orchestra, the Canadian Film Centre, INSEAD, Junior Achievement and an array of other charities.

Awards and recognition 

Over the span of his career, Goldring has served on a number of boards and committees and has earned awards both within and beyond the financial industry.

Past appointments include: past chair of the University of Toronto's World War I Commemoration Committee, past president and member of the board of directors of The National Club, past chair of the Bishop's Company, past member of the board of governors of The Toronto Club, past chair of the Bishop Strachan School Foundation, past vice chair and director of Investment Funds Institute of Canada, past director of the World Wildlife Fund (WWF) Canada, past international chair of INSEAD Alumni Fund (worldwide) and past vice chair of the Toronto Symphony Orchestra.

In 2003, he was inducted into AIESEC Canada's Hall of Fame.

In 2007, he was the recipient of the Person of Influence Award at the Canadian Investment Awards Gala.

In 2009, he received the University of Toronto's Arbour Award. For his work supporting the Canadian military, Goldring was awarded the Meritorious Service Medal by the Governor General of Canada.

In 2011, he was honoured by the B'nai B'rith organization at its 2011 Award of Merit Dinner for his significant contributions for the betterment of society.

In 2012, he received the Queen's Diamond Jubilee Medal.

In 2013, The Anglican Diocese of Toronto recognized him with the Order of the Diocese.

In 2014, he was also recognized with the Vimy Award by the Canadian Defense Associations Institute for his contribution to strengthening the ties between the Canadian military and the public.

In 2017, he was awarded the Canadian Forces Decoration (CD) upon completion of 12 years of service.

In 2018, Blake was appointed a Member of the Order of Canada for his contributions to business and philanthropy, notably for the well-being of veterans and their families.

Personal life 

Goldring lives in Toronto, Canada with his wife and three daughters.

References 

21st-century Canadian businesspeople
Living people
Members of the Order of Canada
Recipients of the Meritorious Service Decoration
University of Toronto alumni
Businesspeople from Toronto
1958 births
INSEAD alumni
CFA charterholders
McGill University alumni